Government Textile Vocational Institute Manikganj is a secondary school in Dighi Union, Manikganj Sadar Upazila, Manikganj, Bangladesh. It provides schooling from class 9 to Secondary School Certificate (SSC). The school started operating from 2012. Its EIIN is 48046.

See also
 Muljan High School, Manikganj
 List of schools in Bangladesh

References

Further reading

External links
 Ministry of Education
 Secondary Education Board

Schools in Manikganj District
Educational institutions established in 2012
2012 establishments in Bangladesh
Vocational education in Bangladesh